is a passenger railway station operated by the Takamatsu-Kotohira Electric Railroad in Takamatsu, Kagawa, Japan. .  It is operated by the private transportation company Takamatsu-Kotohira Electric Railroad (Kotoden) and is designated station "K09".

Lines
Enza Station is a statin on the Kotoden Kotohira Line and is located 11.2 km from the opposing terminus of the line at Takamatsu-Chikkō Station.

Layout
The station consists of a single side platform serving one bi-directional track. Formerly the station had two side platforms, and the ruins of the second platform remain in situ. The station is unattended.

Adjacent stations

History
Enza Station opened on December 21, 1926 as a station of the Kotohira Electric Railway. On November 1, 1943 it became  a station on the Takamatsu Kotohira Electric Railway Kotohira Line due to a company merger.

Surrounding area
Kagawa Prefectural Route 44 Enza Konan Line
Enza Community Center
Takamatsu Municipal Enza Elementary School

Passenger statistics

See also
 List of railway stations in Japan

References

External links

  

Railway stations in Japan opened in 1926
Railway stations in Takamatsu